HK Gomel is an ice hockey team in Gomel in Belarus. It was founded in 2000, and participates in the Belarusian Extraliga.

Honours 

Belarusian Extraliga:
Winners (1) : 2003
Belarusian Cup (ice hockey):
Winners (4) : 2003,- май, 2007, 2012, 2017

External links
 Official website

Ice hockey teams in Belarus
Eastern European Hockey League teams
Belarusian Extraleague teams
Sport in Gomel
2000 establishments in Belarus